Damian Krzysztofik (born 12 April 1988) is a Polish handball player for Chrobry Głogów and the Polish national team.

References

1988 births
Living people
Polish male handball players
People from Mielec